Cimitile is a comune (municipality) in the Metropolitan City of Naples in the Italian region Campania, located about 25 km northeast of Naples. As of 31 December 2017, it had a population of 7 172 and an area of 2.74 km2.  In antiquity Cimitile was the necropolis for the town of Nola, and it was here that Paulinus of Nola founded a monastic community in the year 395.

Cimitile borders the following municipalities: Camposano, Casamarciano, Comiziano, Nola.

Demographic evolution

References

External links
 www.comune.cimitile.na.it/

Cities and towns in Campania